"Kiss Your Mama!" is a song by Australian recording artist Vanessa Amorosi. The song was released in September 2007 as the lead single from Amorosi's third studio album Somewhere in the Real World. The single was serviced to radio on 3 August 2007, with a commercial 2-track single released 8 September 2007.

"Kiss Your Mama!" is a nu-skool guitar rock groove with a blend of vintage soul.
Vanessa co-wrote "Kiss Your Mama!", inspired by the belief of her gal pals that a guy who shows respect to his mother will treat his lady loves right too.

The video was shot in Melbourne with  London director Stuart Gosling (Good Charlotte, Roni Size, Feeder).
Says Vanessa.. "I wanted it   a performance - with no acting or showing much skin to be sexy. I feel sexy onstage anyway. We shot it in an old building which had an amazing vibe inside.

Track listing

Charts

Release history

References

2007 singles
Vanessa Amorosi songs
Songs written by Ron Aniello
Song recordings produced by Ron Aniello
Songs written by Vanessa Amorosi
2007 songs
Songs written by Silya
Universal Music Group singles
Music videos directed by Stuart Gosling